Hack!  is a 2007 American horror film directed and written by Matt Flynn. The film centres on a group of students who, while on a field trip, become victims in a snuff film, and stars Danica McKellar, Jay Kenneth Johnson, William Forsythe, Sean Kanan, Juliet Landau, Justin Chon, Travis Schuldt, Adrienne Frantz and Gabrielle Richens. The film was released in the UK on July 20, 2007 before receiving a US release on December 11, 2007.

Plot
On a small island, a man is chased by an unseen figure. As he stops to catch his breath, his pursuer decapitates him. Meanwhile, a group of teenage college students, including the social outcast Emily, Emily's love interest Johnny, the flamboyant homosexual Ricky, jock Tim, boyish lesbian Maddy, stoner Q and girly-girl Sylvia, are chosen to go on a field trip to a small island. The group, along with their teacher Mr. Argento, meet Captain J.T. Bates who takes them to the island on his boat. Here, the group meet the eccentric couple Vincent King and Mary Shelley who they will be staying with. Mary begins to film the group on her hand-held recorder, saying that she is an aspiring director.

At night, while the group settle in and have dinner with Vincent and Mary, Mr. Argento finds he has to leave the island to retrieve some equipment. However arriving at the boat, Mr. Argento finds J.T. murdered. Meanwhile, the students have a bonfire on the beach. Q leaves the group only to be startled by a figure dressed up as a clown. When he tells the others the incident is ignored and everyone goes to bed, not knowing Mr. Argento has also been murdered. The following day, Sheriff Stoker arrives on the island in search of a missing hunter. He questions Vincent and Mary, but both deny ever seeing him, so the Sheriff leaves. Soon after, Tim and Sylvia sneak into the forest to have sex but are quickly attacked by the killer, who murders Tim with a chainsaw. Sylvia is chased through the forest but is eventually caught before being locked in a cage in an underground dungeon. At dinner, Emily becomes concerned with the various group disappearances before she realises the phone lines are down, however Vincent and Mary convince everyone there is nothing to worry about. The students again have a bonfire on the beach, while Q decides to try and search for a phone signal. He encounters the clown once again, who swiftly crushes his neck and kills him. With Q now also missing, Emily, Johnny, Ricky, and Maddy enter the forest to find their fellow students. Meanwhile, Vincent and Mary watch videos of various murders they have committed and filmed, revealing the couple are making a snuff film.

Sheriff Stoker, having become suspicious about Vincent and Mary, returns to the island, however he is quickly murdered by the couple with an axe. Ricky and Maddy search the forest, but Maddy is soon knocked unconscious by Vincent and Mary while Ricky flees. Maddy awakens sometime later tied to a tree where she encounters Willy who sets her free and tells her she can escape on his boat. While chasing Ricky through the forest, Vincent and Mary stop to record some footage. Vincent bites a chunk out of Mary's neck which eventually kills her. Ricky attacks Vincent but is ultimately shot dead himself. As Johnny and Emily search the forest, Johnny finally kisses her. Overhearing Ricky's death, Johnny leaves to investigate.

Meanwhile, Maddy searches for Willy's boat, but instead finds Emily standing next to a water well. Maddy warns Emily about the murders, but Emily unexpectedly pushes Maddy down the well, impaling her on a spike. Vincent emerges from a nearby tree, congratulating Emily for her performance and luring the students to the island. Vincent informs Emily that Mary is now dead, and it is revealed the pair had an affair behind Mary's back. Johnny soon returns to Emily, but Vincent knocks him unconscious.

Johnny awakens in the dungeon and finds Sylvia still trapped in the cage, which is hanging above a pool of piranha fish. Willy arrives and frees Johnny, but Vincent and Emily also arrive and shoot Willy in the chest with an arrow, presumably killing him. In the ensuing fight, Vincent is severely injured, and Sylvia is plunged into the pool of piranha. Johnny is chased to the beach, where Vincent and Emily catch him. However, Willy reveals himself to have survived and fatally stabs Vincent, but Emily quickly shoots Willy in the head, killing him. Johnny continues to fight with Emily before Sylvia also reveals herself to have survived, and she finally kills Emily. Deputy Radley then arrives on the island to take Johnny and Sylvia home. In a flashback scene, Deputy Radley is shown to be involved with the snuff film, leaving it unknown if Johnny and Sylvia were saved or were murdered also.

Cast

 Danica McKellar as Emily
 Jay Kenneth Johnson as Johnny
 William Forsythe as Willy
 Sean Kanan as Vincent King
 Juliet Landau as Mary Shelley
 Adrienne Frantz as Maddy
 Gabrielle Richens as Sylvia
 Travis Schuldt as Tim
 Wondgy 'Won-G' Bruny as Q
 Justin Chon as Ricky
 Kane Hodder as First Victim
 Burt Young as J.T. Bates
 Tony Burton as Sheriff Stoker
 Lochlyn Munro as Deputy Radley
 Jenna Morasca as Tim's Girlfriend

Reception

The movie was not received well by critics. Steve Barton of Dread Central criticized the "paper-thin" storyline. Black Horror Movies criticized the film for excessive clichés.

References

External links
 
 

2007 films
2017 horror films
American teen horror films
Films directed by Matt Flynn
Films about snuff films
Horror films about clowns
Parodies of horror
2000s English-language films
2000s American films